Britain's Got Talent is a British reality television talent show that has aired fifteen series on ITV since 9 June 2007. This is a list of television ratings for all broadcast episodes.

Series overview

Ratings

Series 1 (2007)

Series 2 (2008)

Series 3 (2009)

Series 4 (2010)

Series 5 (2011)

Series 6 (2012)

Series 7 (2013)

Series 8 (2014)

Series 9 (2015)

Series 10 (2016)

Series 11 (2017)

Series 12 (2018)

Series 13 (2019)

Series 14 (2020)

Series 15 (2022)

References 

Episodes
Lists of British non-fiction television series episodes